"Olé" is a song by English singer John Newman, it was written and produced by Scottish DJ and record producer Calvin Harris. The song was released as a digital download on 8 July 2016 as a non-album single, peaking at number 120 and number 47 on the UK Singles Chart and Scottish Singles Chart respectively.

Charts

Release history

References

2016 singles
2016 songs
Island Records singles
John Newman (singer) songs
Songs written by Calvin Harris